Neomolgus littoralis is a species of snout mite in the family Bdellidae. It is found in Europe.

References

Trombidiformes
Articles created by Qbugbot